Lydham Heath railway station was a station in Lydham, Shropshire, England. The station was opened on 1 February 1866 and closed on 20 April 1935.

As of September 2009, the only visible remains of the station is the cattle dock.

References

Further reading

Disused railway stations in Shropshire
Railway stations in Great Britain opened in 1866
Railway stations in Great Britain closed in 1935